The Dill Farm Site (7K-E-12) is a prehistoric archaeological site in Kent County, Delaware, near the town of Sandtown.  The site located in a formerly swampy area, has yielded dates (some by radiocarbon dating, others by pollen analysis) of 500 BC and 8000 BC.  Carey Complex ceramics (dating to c. 600 AD) have also been found at the  site.

The site was listed on the National Register of Historic Places in 1978.

See also
National Register of Historic Places listings in Kent County, Delaware

References

Archaeological sites on the National Register of Historic Places in Delaware
Kent County, Delaware
National Register of Historic Places in Kent County, Delaware